The women's discus F54-56 event at the 2008 Summer Paralympics took place at the Beijing National Stadium at 09:00 on 9 September.
There was a single round of competition; after the first three throws, only the top eight had 3 further throws.
The competition was won by Marianne Buggenhagen, representing .

Results

 
WR = World Record. SB = Seasonal Best.

References
 

Athletics at the 2008 Summer Paralympics
2008 in women's athletics